Elmdale may refer to:

Places
United States
 Elmdale, Indiana
 Elmdale, Kansas
 Elmdale, Michigan
 Elmdale, Minnesota
 Elmdale Township, Morrison County, Minnesota

Canada
 Elmdale Public School, Ottawa, Ontario
 Elmdale Street, Georgina (Keswick), Ontario

See also
Elmsdale (disambiguation)